Jaora railway station is a main railway station in Jaora city of Madhya Pradesh. Its code is JAO. Jaora is an important broad gauge railway station of the Ajmer - Ratlam line. Jaora is well connected to Ratlam, Ujjain via Nagda and Kota, Bundi via Chittorgarh.

Trains 

The major trains passing from Jaora are:

 Bandra Terminus Udaipur Superfast Express
 Veer Bhumi Chittaurgarh Express
 Jodhpur - Indore Express
 Jaipur - Hyderabad Weekly Express
 Ajmer–Hyderabad Express
 Ratlam - Udaipur City Express
 Bhopal–Jaipur Express
 Bandra Terminus Udaipur Express
 Ajmer Bandra Terminus Express
 Indore–Jaipur Express via Ajmer 
 Okha - Nathdwara Express
 Mandsaur - Meerut City Link Express
 Haldighati Passenger

References

Railway stations in Ratlam district
Ratlam railway division